Halfdan Hussey is the director and co-founder of Cinequest Inc and the CEO of Cinequest Maverick Studio LLC.  He is the author of To The Dogs and 7 Powers of Creating and the film director and producer of Life is Love and Seizing Me.
Halfdan was named one of the 25 people who dramatically changed the Silicon Valley over the past 25 years by Metro Newspaper 2010.

Early life
Hussey was raised in Boulder, Colorado. His father was a teacher and worked part-time as a projectionist. He graduated from University of Colorado with a degree in English. He later moved to New York City and took film classes at NYU. While writing the screenplay for his first film, He’s Still There, he worked as a taxi cab driver in New York City.

Career
Hussey co-founded the Cinequest Film Festival with Kathleen Powell in 1990. It was listed as one of the top 10 film festivals and best digital festivals by The Ultimate Guide to Film Festivals in 2004.

Hussey has written two books, To The Dogs and 7 Powers of Creating. To The Dogs is a fictional novel about two brothers who must decide whether to follow their father’s footsteps in crime or take another path. 7 Powers of Creating is a non-fiction novel that shows the seven necessary steps to transform one’s ideas into reality.

Hussey is the CEO of Cinequest’s Maverick Studio LLC. This company produces, co-produces, and distributes films, documentaries, television, and new media. In 2003, he produced and directed Seizing Me. In 2008, he wrote and directed Still Waters Burn. In 2014, he directed and produced Life is Love. The film centers around Somaly Mam and young women who are survivors of sex trafficking in Cambodia.

References

External links
Bio at Conquest
 http://www.metroactive.com/movies/Cinequest-2014-Preview.html
 http://www.bizjournals.com/sanjose/print-edition/2013/02/22/halfdan-husseys-silver-screen-dreams.html?page=2
 https://www.wired.com/entertainment/music/news/2005/03/66755

Date of birth missing (living people)
Living people
Businesspeople from Boulder, Colorado
Writers from Boulder, Colorado
Year of birth missing (living people)